Au SG railway station is a railway station in Au, in the Swiss canton of St. Gallen. It is an intermediate stop on the Chur–Rorschach line.

Services 
Au SG is served by two services of the St. Gallen S-Bahn:

 : hourly service between Nesslau-Neu St. Johann and Altstätten SG
 : hourly service via Sargans (circular operation).

References

External links 
 
 

Railway stations in the canton of St. Gallen
Swiss Federal Railways stations